Cryptachaea pusillana is a tangle web spider species found in French Guiana.

See also 
 List of Theridiidae species

References

External links 

Theridiidae
Arthropods of South America
Fauna of French Guiana
Spiders of South America
Spiders described in 1942